The Apostolic Nuncio to Chile is the principal representative of the Pope to the Government of Chile.

Apostolic Nuncios to Chile

Giovanni Alessandro Muzi (18 April 1823 – 19 December 1825)
Lorenzo Barili (26 May 1851 – 17 June 1856)
Vincenzo Massoni (26 September 1856 – 3 June 1857)
Marino Marini (14 August 1857 – 27 March 1865)
Mario Mocenni (6 August 1877 – 27 February 1882)
Celestino del Frate (30 March 1882 – 6 March 1883)
Pietro Monti (20 December 1902 – 31 October 1907)
Enrico Sibilia (31 August 1908 – April 1914) 
Sebastiano Nicotra (18 December 1916 – 1 October 1918)
Benedetto Aloisi Masella (20 November 1919 – 26 April 1927) 
Ettore Felici (6 November 1927 – 20 April 1938) 
Aldo Laghi (28 August 1938 – 2 January 1942) 
Maurilio Silvani (23 May 1942 – 4 March 1946)
Mario Zanin (21 March 1947 – 7 February 1953) 
Sebastiano Baggio (1 July 1953 – 12 March 1959) 
Opilio Rossi (25 Mar 1959 – 25 September 1961) 
Gaetano Alibrandi (5 October 1961 – 9 December 1963) 
Egano Righi-Lambertini (9 December 1963 – 8 July 1967) 
Carlo Martini (5 August 1967 – 6 July 1970) 
Sotero Sanz Villalba (16 July 1970 – 24 November 1977) 
Angelo Sodano (30 November 1977 – 23 May 1988) 
Giulio Einaudi (23 September 1988 – 29 February 1992) 
Piero Biggio (23 April 1992 – 27 February 1999) 
Luigi Ventura (25 March 1999 – 22 June 2001) 
Aldo Cavalli (28 June 2001 – 29 October 2007)
Giuseppe Pinto (6 December 2007 – 15 July 2011)
Ivo Scapolo (15 July 2011 – 29 August 2019)
Alberto Ortega Martín (7 October 2019 – present)

See also
Roman Catholicism in Chile
Religion in Chile

References

Catholic Church in Chile
 
Chile–Holy See relations
Chile

it:Chiesa cattolica in Cile#Nunziatura apostolica